The Piaggio XEvo is a series of scooters produced by Italian manufacturer Piaggio. The line shares various components and design, and sporting different engines sizes of 125 cc, 250 cc and 400 cc, and is a direct development of the Piaggio X8.

Specifications 
All models sport a single-cylinder, four-stroke, multi-valve engine that meets Euro 3 European emission standards, and have a continuously variable transmission (CVT)

The 125 cc model has a carburettor 124 cc Lead engine, the 250 cc has a liquid-cooled, fuel-injected 244 cc Quasar engine that delivers , and the 400 cc model's Master liquid-cooled, electronic fuel injection 399 cc engine power output rates .

The storage compartment also has a foldaway seat cover and a courtesy light. The front shield area, besides the odometer, trip computer and tachometer, provides further space to place small items and is also equipped with a 12 volt plug to use a GPS, or recharge a mobile phone.

All XEvo models have a steel tube frame and the front suspension is provided via a 35 mm fork; rear suspension is done via two double-acting hydraulic shock absorbers, with a four-position spring preload adjustment.
Braking on all models is performed by a 240 mm rear disc brake. In the front, both the 125 cc and 250 cc models feature a single 260 mm front disc, the 400 cc version has two 240 mm front discs.
All models have a 14-inch front wheel. The rear wheel on the 125 and 250 is 12 inches, and  14 inches on the 400 cc version.

The direction indicators double as hazard warning indicators. The rear seat grab handles feature a high grip central insert for extra passenger safety, extending rearwards sporting a backrest.

References

External links
Piaggio UK XEvo web page

Xevo
Motor scooters
Maxi scooters